Brooklyn Brothers is an album led by saxophonist Cecil Payne and pianist Duke Jordan recorded in 1973 and released on the Muse label.

Reception

In his review for AllMusic, Ron Wynn called it "a nice session".

Track listing
All compositions by Cecil Payne, except as indicated
 "Egg Head" - 3:16
 "I Should Care" (Sammy Cahn, Axel Stordahl, Paul Weston) - 5:31
 "Jordu" (Duke Jordan) - 5:26
 "Jazz Vendor" (Jordan) - 4:29
 "Cu-Ba" - 6:05
 "I Want to Talk About You" (Billy Eckstine) - 3:45
 "Cerupa" - 5:12
 "No Problem" (Jordan) - 4:07

Personnel
Cecil Payne - baritone saxophone, flute -track 7
Duke Jordan - piano - trio track 2
Sam Jones - bass 
Al Foster - drums

References

1973 albums
Cecil Payne albums
Duke Jordan albums
Muse Records albums
Albums produced by Don Schlitten